Sharknado is a series of six American made-for-television science fiction action comedy horror disaster films released by Syfy between 2013 and 2018. It has since been expanded into video games and comics, including a spin-off film, Sharknado: Heart of Sharkness, that was released in 2015. The first two films received mixed to positive reviews from critics, while the others received negative reviews.

The series stars Ian Ziering as Fin Shepard and Tara Reid as April Wexler—a husband and wife who encounter "sharknadoes", tornadoes filled with sharks, wherever they go.

Films

Sharknado (2013)

A freak cyclone hits Los Angeles causing man-eating sharks to be scooped up in water spouts and flood the city with shark-infested seawater. Bar-owner and surfer Fin (Ian Ziering) sets out with his friends to rescue his estranged wife, April (Tara Reid), and their teenage daughter, Claudia, before the "sharknado" reaches them.

Sharknado 2: The Second One (2014)

While Fin and April are in New York City to promote April's book, How to Survive a Sharknado and Other Unnatural Disasters, about the Los Angeles sharknado, the city is hit by a severe storm causing new "sharknadoes" to emerge.

Sharknado 3: Oh Hell No! (2015)

Following the events of the previous film, Fin and April have remarried and are expecting another child. For his heroics in the "sharknado" battles in Los Angeles and New York, Fin is in Washington, D.C., to receive an award from the president. However, when he is there he encounters a new "sharknado" which begins to make its way down the "Feast Coast" to Florida.

Sharknado: The 4th Awakens (2016)

Sharknado 4 was confirmed to follow upon Sharknado 3s premiere. Sharknado 3 concludes with a cliffhanger regarding whether or not April is killed by falling wreckage. An ad after the film promotes a Twitter campaign offering fans the chance to decide her fate with the hashtags "#AprilLives" or "#AprilDies", with the results revealed at the start of Sharknado 4, which first aired on Syfy on July 31, 2016. Ian Ziering, Tara Reid, Ryan Newman, and David Hasselhoff reprise their roles from previous films. New cast members include: Tommy Davidson as Aston Reynolds, playboy tech billionaire and Astro-X president; Cody Linley replacing Chuck Hittinger as Matt Shepard; Imani Hakim as Gabrielle, a soldier and Matt's wife; Gary Busey as Wilford Wexler, April's rich father; Cheryl Tiegs as Raye Shepard, Fin's mother; Masiela Lusha as Gemini, Fin's cousin.

The title and poster of the film is a homage to Star Wars: The Force Awakens.

Sharknado 5: Global Swarming (2017)

A fifth Sharknado film was confirmed in October 2016, and was released on August 6, 2017. The title was going to be Sharknado 5... Earth 0, but on June 1, 2017, the title was unveiled to be Sharknado 5: Global Swarming with the tagline "Make America Bait Again", a reference to the slogan "Make America Great Again" by President Donald Trump. Ian Ziering and Tara Reid reprised their roles as Fin Shepard and April Wexler. Cassie Scerbo also reprised for this installment. Filming occurred in more than 5 countries, including the UK, Australia and Bulgaria. This storyline depicts Fin and his allies accidentally unleashing a new wave of sharknados when they deactivate an ancient device that was actually keeping the Sharknados in check, the subsequent storms escalating to the point that they devastate the planet, leaving only Fin alive, until he is met by a time-displaced version of his son Gil.

The Last Sharknado: It's About Time (2018) 

The Last Sharknado: It's About Time was released on August 19, 2018. Tara Reid, Ian Ziering and Cassie Scerbo returned. A write-up in Bloody Disgusting in February 2018 said: "In his quest, Fin fights Nazis, dinosaurs, knights, and even takes a ride on Noah's Ark." On March 28, 2018, Syfy confirmed the film would be the final installment of the series. On May 25, the film's title was revealed by a released teaser trailer. Vivica A. Fox, who had starred in Sharknado 2, reprises her role for the final installment. With Fin the last survivor, he finds himself travelling through time to meet supposedly-deceased allies (pulled out of time by Gil at the moment before their deaths) seeking to identify and prevent the first of the modern-day Sharknados. After subduing potential Sharknados in Camelot, the War of Independence, and the Wild West, Fin is able to destroy the original Sharknado before it could escalate into the global catastrophes he has witnessed, creating a new timeline where Fin is still just the bar owner he was in the original film, surrounded by his extended family.

Spin-off films

Lavalantula (2015)

Lavalantula is a spin-off of Sharknado, about fire spitting tarantulas causing havoc over Los Angeles, starring some of the cast from Police Academy. It features an appearance by Ian Ziering as Fin Shepard - tying the film into the Sharknado universe.

2 Lava 2 Lantula (2016)
A sequel to Lavalantula called 2 Lava 2 Lantula premiered on Syfy on August 6, 2016. Some of the cast from the original film returned, including Steve Guttenberg, Marion Ramsey and Michael Winslow.

2025 Armageddon (2022)
2025 Armageddon is a crossover film released to celebrate the 25th anniversary of The Asylum, and features an alien race using Sharknado alongside other films from The Asylum as the basis for monsters sent to attack Earth.  The film was released on digital storefronts on December 23rd, 2022.

Cast and crew

Cast
 This table only includes characters which have appeared in more than one film in the series.
 A dark grey cell indicates the character was not in the film.
 A  indicates an appearance through archival footage or audio

Crew

Reception

Box office performance

Critical and public response

Other media

Video game

Sharknado: The Video Game

Sharknado: The Video Game is a 2014 endless running video game developed by Other Ocean Interactive and published by Majesco Entertainment. It was based on Sharknado 2: The Second One and was released for iOS on July 25, 2014. It was deleted from the App Store in 2017.

Book

How to Survive a Sharknado
How to Survive a Sharknado and Other Unnatural Disasters: Fight Back When Monsters and Mother Nature Attack is a book by Andrew Shaffer, a real-life version of the book-within-the-movie Sharknado 2: The Second One.

Comic books

Archie vs. Sharknado
Archie vs. Sharknado is a one-shot comic book simultaneously published by Archie Comics on July 22, 2015, as a tie-in to Sharknado 3: Oh Hell No!. It deals with Riverdale being hit by a storm of sharknadoes and Archie and the gang having to deal with them as they make their way down the "Feast Coast". The one-shot was written by series director Anthony C. Ferrante, with art by longtime Archie artist Dan Parent. The comic book received an average score of 7.2/10 based on 15 critical reviews according to review aggregator Comic Book Roundup.

Documentaries

Sharknado: Feeding Frenzy (2015)
Sharknado: Feeding Frenzy is a documentary about the making of the film series.

Sharknado: Heart of Sharkness (2015)
The mockumentary tells the story of David Moore, the filmmaker who first dreamed of "sharks in a tornado" and brought on disaster by using real sharks. It was written and directed by Jeremy Wagener, and released on October 6, 2015, on video on demand.

The Real Sharknado (2021) 
During the 2021 Shark Week, Discovery Channel aired a special starring Ian Ziering and Tara Reid as themselves debunking many of the shark myths from the film series. It originally aired on July 14, 2021.

References

American film series
Comedy film series
Film series introduced in 2013
Horror film series